Company Pictures is an independent British television production company which has produced drama programming for many broadcasters. It was set up in 1998 by Charles Pattinson and George Faber, colleagues at BBC Films. Their first film was Morvern Callar, which was credited as a co-production with BBC Films as they had begun developing it while still employed there. In 2003 Company Pictures became part of All3Media. The founders, Pattinson and Faber, left in 2012 to set up another independent production company, and  John Yorke became managing director until 2015. He was succeeded by Michele Buck, former joint managing director of Mammoth Screen.

For both artistic and fiscal reasons, when producing the TV series The White Queen, Company Pictures entered into collaboration with a Flemish production house. This enabled them to film in the medieval cities of Ghent and Bruges, while receiving tax-breaks as a European co-production and for investment in Flanders.

References

Television production companies of the United Kingdom
All3Media